Cecilia Cipressi (born 26 February 1977), best known as Syria or Airys, is an Italian singer and entertainer.

Life and career 
Born in Rome, Syria is the daughter of Elio Cipressi, a record producer and former singer. Noted by composer Claudio Mattone, she won the  Newcomers competition at the 46th edition of the Sanremo Music Festival with the song "Non ci sto", and one year later she placed third in the Big Artists competition of the Festival with the song "Sei tu".

In 2002, she debuted as a songwriter with the song "Lettera ad Alice". In 2009, she adopted the stage name Airys for the electro-dance EP Vivo, amo, esco. In 2011 Syria was vocal coach in the Rai 2 talent show Star Academy, and in 2016 she was a juror in the Italia 1 talent show TOP DJ. She also was a stage actress alongside Paolo Rossi and Francesco Paolantoni.

Discography 
Albums
 
     1996 - Non ci sto
     1997 - L'angelo
     1998 - Station Wagon
     2000 - Come una goccia d'acqua
     2002 - Le mie favole
     2005 - Non è peccato
     2008 - Un'altra me
     2009 - Vivo amo esco (EP, under the pseudonym Airys)
     2011 - Scrivere al futuro
     2014 - Syria 10
     2017 - 10+10

References

External links 
  
 Syria at Discogs

 

Singers from Rome
1977 births
Living people
Italian pop singers
Italian women singers
Sanremo Music Festival winners of the newcomers section